Tyutryumovo is a rural locality (a village) in Novlenskoye Rural Settlement, Vologodsky District, Vologda Oblast, Russia. The population was 4 as of 2002.

Geography 
Tyutryumovo is located 88 km northwest of Vologda (the district's administrative centre) by road. Omogayevo is the nearest rural locality.

References 

Rural localities in Vologodsky District